Johnny Turbo is a superhero character created to advertise the Turbo Duo, a hybrid of the Turbografx-16 console and its add-on, the TurboGrafx CD, in North America. The character was conceived by Turbo Technologies Inc. (a venture of NEC and Hudson Soft) as a mascot of the console.

Previously, NEC used Bonk as the Turbografx-16's mascot. Later, continuing this theme, TTi would adopt Air Zonk (a cyborg-Bonk who starred in horizontal shooters Air Zonk and Super Air Zonk: Rockabilly-Paradise) as the mascot for TurboDuo.

Unlike Bonk or Zonk, Johnny Turbo never starred in any games. Instead, his only appearances were in three comic book-like advertisements published in gaming magazines of the day, such as Video Games & Computer Entertainment and Electronic Gaming Monthly. The character was briefly revived for a playable appearance in the 2019 puzzle game Crystal Crisis. He was also used in the name and banner for Johnny Turbo's Arcade, a collection of Data East arcade games for the Nintendo Switch.

Johnny Turbo and his partner Tony were pitted against monsters or androids from a company called "FEKA" (a thinly veiled parody of Sega), which, in the comics, misled children into wasting their money on their CD add-on system (a thinly veiled parody of the Sega CD).

Johnny Turbo is the alter-ego of Jonathan Brandstetter, who is based on a real life game developer, John C. Brandstetter. Brandstetter provided the character's voice for his appearance in Crystal Crisis. Tony, the sidekick of Johnny Turbo, is based on Tony Ancona.

Plot 
Three issues were published in Electronic Gaming Monthly.  Each issue consisted of four full-color pages.  The issues were numbered 43 through 45.

The first issue (#43), "The Master Plan!," opens with Mr. FEKA and some FEKA agents discussing the company's master plan: to convince children their system is the only CD console available. "Computer expert" Jonathan Brandstetter learns of this, and, as Johnny Turbo, confronts FEKA agents selling their console on the streets. He informs the kids that the TurboDuo was the first CD system to market, and defeats the FEKA agents.

In the second issue (#44), "Let 'em Dangle!!," Mr. FEKA assures his underlings that they can get rich as long as kids are convinced the FEKA CD is a complete system. Johnny Turbo interrupts a FEKA sale at a local toy store, reveals the truth about the FEKA system. Observing from a control room, Mr. FEKA decides it's time to teach Johnny Turbo a lesson.

The surrealistic third issue (#45), "Sleepwalker," opens with Tony heading to bed. In his dream he hears Johnny Turbo's voice, telling him about Gate of Thunder and Lords of Thunder, and telling him a code to access Bomberman on a three-in-one disc.

Reception
Jonathan J. Burtenshaw, who wrote an essay appearing in the Classic Gaming section of the GameSpy website, described the advertising campaign as seeming "petty" and "overly confrontational." Burtenshaw believed that the campaign contributed to the demise of the gaming system.

See also 
 TurboGrafx
 Air Zonk

References

External links 
 The Johnny Turbo Story - featuring scans of the ads and running commentary
 Johnny Turbo appears in Nicalis' Crystal Crisis game

Video game mascots
Male characters in advertising
Male characters in video games
Advertising characters
TurboGrafx-16